Leslie David Hick (23 April 1927 – 1971) was an English professional footballer who played as an outside right.

Career
Born in Acomb, Hick signed for Bradford City in July 1948 after playing amateur football (for the Army), leaving the club in July 1950. During his time with Bradford City he made one appearance in the Football League.

Sources

References

1927 births
1971 deaths
Date of death missing
English footballers
Bradford City A.F.C. players
English Football League players
Association football outside forwards